The 1967 World Table Tennis Championships – Swaythling Cup (men's team) was the 29th edition of the men's team championship.  

Japan won the gold medal defeating North Korea 5–3 in the final. Sweden won the bronze medal after winning third place play off.   

The Chinese team were unable to defend their title because of the Cultural Revolution.

Medalists

Team

Swaythling Cup tables

Semifinal round

Group 1

Group 2

Third-place playoff

Final

See also
List of World Table Tennis Championships medalists

References

-